Kabiraji is an Indian fried dish made of chicken, fish., mutton or prawn. This is a popular dish in eastern India, originating from Kolkata. The dish has a fish, chicken or mutton cutlet inside, wrapped in a coating of crunchy deep-fried egg floss.

See also
 List of Indian dishes

References 

Indian meat dishes